Rabbi Yaakov Glasman  is a rabbi and communal leader in the Jewish community of Melbourne, Australia.

Rabbinic career 
Glasman was a pulpit rabbi at the North Eastern Jewish Centre before taking up the role at St. Kilda Hebrew Congregation, one of Australia's oldest and largest congregations, replacing Rabbi Philip Heilbrunn.

He served as the president of the Rabbinical Council of Victoria (RCV) from 2009-2012 and has been a leading voice on interfaith dialogue. He oversaw the RCV’s guide to multi-faith interactions and presented the first copy to Victorian Premier Ted Baillieu in August 2011. In March 2020 he joined a group of Jewish communal leaders to visit Melbourne’s Lysterfield Mosque on the first anniversary of the Christchurch massacre and in May 2019 Glasman joined Catholic Archbishop Peter Comensoli as joint keynote speakers at a Catholic-Jewish friendship dinner. In November 2011 the Rabbinical Council of Victoria produced a set of guidelines enabling religious volunteers to protect communal institutions on the Sabbath and Jewish festivals in accordance with Jewish Law, a project which followed years of in-depth research and consultation with overseas Jewish legal experts and Melbourne’s Community Security Group. In 2010 the RCV was criticized by the Jewish Community Council of Victoria for attending a meeting on counter terrorism with the then federal Attorney-General Robert McClelland. However, Glasman defended the RCV's attendance saying his organisation was one of a number of faith groups invited by the attorney general to contribute and as an invited guest, the RCV had every right to attend.

Glasman has also been an active campaigner against violence against women and was a White Ribbon Ambassador until the White Ribbon organisation closed its doors and campaigned against alcohol abuse within the Jewish community especially during the Jewish community’s religious festivals. When the Organization of Rabbis of Australia (ORA) was closed due to the revelations of the Royal Commission into Institutional Responses to Child Sexual Abuse, Glasman was elected to be the second president of its replacement entity the Rabbinical Council of Australia and New Zealand (RCANZ) following Rabbi Paul Lewin, who served for one year. He held this position until he handed the role over to Rabbi Moshe Gutnick.

Glasman was appointed a Member of the Order of Australia for "significant service to Judaism and interfaith dialogue, to rabbinical bodies, and to the community" in the 2021 Queen's Birthday Honours.

Positions 
During the Marriage Equality Plebiscite in 2017, while still president of the RCANZ, Glasman took a stand against the RCV who had released a statement saying that all Jews should vote against the proposal. Glasman said that the RCV should not be telling people how to vote on divisive issues. In response to Glasman's statement, Rabbi Chaim Cowen, one of the authors of the statement, resigned from the RCANZ. However, Glasman did support allowing "religious institutions to select employees who adhere to religious values [of that school]".

During the Royal commission into Institutional Responses to Child Sexual Abuse, Glasman took a consistent stance on the historic wrongs of the covering up of abuse, and was forceful in his view that under Jewish law any knowledge of abuse must be taken to police. Glasman dismissed some of the troubling findings from the Royal Commission as a fringe group within the rabbinic community. One of these claims included they did not know as a fact that it was against the law for an adult to touch the genitals of a minor. Glasman claimed that the rabbinic community had distanced themselves from such claims, and that they were disturbed by them.

Glasman joined the rabbinic community in opposing the proposed Voluntary Assisted Dying legislation in Victoria. Glasman said "halakha views human life as sacred and its worth is not measured by varying levels of quality of life. With regard to end-of-life decisions, halakha clearly and categorically prohibits the performance of any act that shortens a patient’s life."

In 2018, Glasman became the first Jewish religious leader in Australia to present at Tedx Melbourne.

References 

Australian rabbis
Australian Orthodox rabbis
Living people
Year of birth missing (living people)
Members of the Order of Australia